V.I.S.A. Présente was a live compilation released in 1984 by labels Bondage Records and V.I.S.A. This release included 14 tracks by experimental groups from the European alternative scene, including Kukl, an Icelandic group led by singer Björk Guðmundsdóttir next to second vocalist and trumpet player Einar Örn Benediktsson, Rubella Ballet, Lucrate Milk and more.

Track listing

Side one

Side two

External links
V.I.S.A.

Record label compilation albums
1984 compilation albums
Punk rock compilation albums